The 2013–14 Detroit Red Wings season was the 88th season for the National Hockey League (NHL) franchise that was established on September 25, 1926. In the 2013–14 season, the Wings went 39–28–15, finishing fourth in the Atlantic Division and qualifying for the 2014 Stanley Cup playoffs as a Wildcard. The team was eliminated in the first round of the playoffs, losing the best-of-seven series to the Boston Bruins, four games to one.

Mike Babcock served his ninth year as head coach of the Red Wings, while Henrik Zetterberg served as the team's captain.

Realignment
This will mark the first season of a new divisional format change which the number of divisions are reduced to four. Detroit will be in a division with the Boston Bruins, Ottawa Senators, Montreal Canadiens, Buffalo Sabres, Florida Panthers, Tampa Bay Lightning and Toronto Maple Leafs in the Eastern Conference as opposed to the Red Wings long standing within the Western Conference. This format will continue until the league either expands or a relocation requires a change.

It will also present an added difficulty in extending the club's playoff streak. The Red Wings' division is one of two eight-team divisions, as opposed to two seven-team divisions in the West. According to NHL.com 
"The Stanley Cup Playoffs will still consist of 16 teams, eight in each conference, but it will be division-based and a wild-card system has been added.

The top three teams in each division will make up the first 12 teams in the playoffs. The remaining four spots will be filled by the next two highest-placed finishers in each conference, based on regular-season points and regardless of division. It will be possible, then, for one division to send five teams to the post-season while the other sends three." This means the Eastern Conference teams will fight to be one of eight teams out of 16, while the Western Conference has better odds with eight of 14 teams making the playoffs. The Red Wings will have a statistically harder time making the playoffs under this format. The league dismissed the issue as minor and focused on increased home and home series and the vast majority of games being played in the teams own time zone.

Members of the media also predicted that Detroit and the Columbus Blue Jackets (the other team to switch conferences from the west) would benefit from the greatly reduced travel and less physical level of play on average in the Eastern Conference. The move of Detroit and Columbus to the Eastern Conference allowed the Winnipeg Jets to be moved to the Western Conference, two calendar years from when the Atlanta Thrashers were officially relocated and renamed the Jets (not to be confused with the Winnipeg Jets (1972–96), who are still the Phoenix Coyotes).

The Red Wings will compete directly against three of the Original Six teams in their division, as well as against the team of the general manager of the Tampa Bay Lightning and former Red Wing Hockey Hall of Famer, Steve Yzerman. They will lose longtime rivals in the Chicago Blackhawks and St. Louis Blues. They also will no longer serve as the rivals for the Nashville Predators or Columbus Blue Jackets, though they would still have a decent shot at meeting Columbus in the Conference play in the playoffs as well as play every team in the NHL at least twice per year in the regular season.

It is likely that there will be an NHL league expansion in the near future, but Detroit will likely remain in the Eastern Conference permanently after a hard-fought campaign over the years to be moved East.

The team will also play in a rescheduled Winter Classic game on New Year's Day at Michigan Stadium in Ann Arbor, Michigan, as well as participate in alumni games and other events at Comerica Park. The planned events were temporarily cancelled following the 2012–13 NHL lockout.

Off-season
On June 18, 2013, the Red Wings re-signed fan favorite and all-star Pavel Datsyuk to a three-year extension that will keep him in Detroit through the 2016–17 season and pay him $23 million.

In a surprise move that shocked Ottawa fans, captain and multiple franchise record holder Daniel Alfredsson signed as a free agent a one-year $5.5 million contract with the Red Wings on July 5, the first day of free agency. This came as a surprise to Detroit fans, as the 18-year veteran seemed destined to retire having only played for the Senators. "It pretty much came down to a selfish decision in terms of I have not won a Stanley Cup, a big priority for me," Alfredsson explained in a candid conference call with the media.

Alfredsson continued explaining how hard of a decision it was and gave his reasoning. "I feel that in Ottawa they are getting closer and closer and they have a really bright future in front of them, but at this point in my career there's not much left," Alfredsson said. "I don't have the time to wait for that." He also stated that, "I didn't really see myself making a change if you would have asked me a week ago, but as we got closer to free agency, thoughts started creeping in I've played 18 years and haven't won a Stanley Cup." Ottawa, coincidentally, host the Detroit Red Wings several times in the 2013–14 season due to a change to a four-division realignment format that brings Detroit into the Eastern Conference, as well as the same division as Ottawa.

Signing Alfredsson seemed to close the door on young bright spot from the prior season, Damien Brunner. Detroit added on the same day centre Stephen Weiss, a former fourth overall pick in 2001 of the Florida Panthers. His numbers were comparable to Valtteri Filppula, who the club seemed unwilling to pay the $5 million salary he wanted, and instead gave Weiss a five-year deal worth $4.9 million per year.

The Red Wings also lost three key members of the front-office staff when Jim Nill, former director of amateur scouting for the Red Wings, took the general management job of the Dallas Stars. Joe McDonnell, who replaced Nill for a few weeks as director of amateur scouting, and amateur scout Mark Leach followed their former colleague Nill to the Stars.

Regular season
The Red Wings set a franchise record this season, surpassing their most man-games lost due to injury or illness in one season since the stat started being kept in 1985–86. The previous high was 346, which Detroit eclipsed on March 23 against the Minnesota Wild. Detroit ended the season with 421 man-games lost, second to only to the Pittsburgh Penguins, including six key players who missed at least 25 games. Fifteen players missed ten or more games, resulting in Detroit dressing 38 different players during the regular season. That marks the most since the team used 45 in the 1990–91 season. Nine players made their NHL debuts with the Red Wings this season, their highest total since 14 debuted in 1990–91.

The Red Wings reached several milestones as a franchise this season, including their 3,000th home game (1/31 vs. Washington), 3,000th road game (2/26 at Montreal) and 6,000th game (2/8 at Tampa Bay). After the 2013–14 regular season, the Red Wings stand at 2,774–2,328–815–107, ranking third in NHL history in wins.

Standings

Schedule and results

Pre-season

Regular season

Playoffs

Player statistics

Skaters

Goaltenders

Goaltenders

†Denotes player spent time with another team before joining the Red Wings. Stats reflect time with the Red Wings only.
‡Traded mid-season
Bold/italics denotes franchise record

Awards and honours

Awards

Milestones

Transactions
The Red Wings have been involved in the following transactions during the 2013–14 season.

Trades

Free agents signed

Free agents lost

|-
|}

Player signings

Draft picks

The Detroit Red Wings' picks at the 2013 NHL Entry Draft, held in Newark, New Jersey on June 30, 2013.

Draft notes
 The Detroit Red Wings' first-round pick went to the San Jose Sharks as the result of a trade on June 30, 2013, that sent a first-round pick in 2013 (20th overall) and Pittsburgh's second-round pick in 2013 (58th overall) to Detroit in exchange for this pick.
 The Pittsburgh Penguins second-round pick went to the Detroit Red Wings (via San Jose), San Jose traded this pick to Detroit as a result of a trade on June 30, 2013, that sent a first round pick in 2013 (18th overall) to San Jose in return for a first round pick in 2013 (20th overall) and this pick.

References

Detroit Red Wings seasons
Detroit Red Wings season, 2013-14
Detroit
Detroit Red
Detroit Red